Don't Break the Heart That Loves You is a studio album by American country music artist Margo Smith. It was released in May 1978 via Warner Bros. Records and contained ten tracks. The album included a mixture of new recordings and covers of original hits by other artists. It was the fifth studio release of Smith's career and spawned three major hits, including the number one country songs "Don't Break the Heart That Loves You" and "It Only Hurts for a Little While."

Background and content
Margo Smith had several years of country hits after signing with Warner Bros. Records in 1976 with such songs as "Take My Breath Away." Between November 1977 and January 1978, Smith went into the studio to cut her third studio recording for Warner Bros. The sessions were produced by Norro Wilson, who had also worked with Smith on her two previous studio offerings. The sessions were held at the Columbia Recording Studio in Nashville, Tennessee. 

Don't Break the Heart That Loves You contained a total of ten tracks. It included a mixture of new recordings and cover versions of previously-released material. Of the new cuts were two songs penned by Smith herself titled "Make Love the Way We Used To" and "Ode to a Cheater." Of the covers were two songs first made pop hits by Connie Francis: the title track and "Breakin' in a Brand New Broken Heart." Other covers included "Just Out of Reach (Of My Two Open Arms)," "Memories Are Made of This" and the Ames Brothers' "It Only Hurts for a Little While."

Release and reception

Don't Break the Heart That Loves You was released in May 1978 on Warner Bros. Records. It became the fifth studio album of Smith's career and her third for the Warner label. It was originally offered as a vinyl LP containing five songs on each side of the record. In similar format, it was issued via cassette. The album peaked at number 27 on the Billboard Top Country Albums chart. It was Smith's highest-peaking LP on the chart. Don't Break the Heart That Loves You received a three-star rating from AllMusic. 

The project also spawned three singles. The first was the title track (issued as a single in December 1977), which became Smith's first number one hit on the Billboard Hot Country Songs chart. Its second single was released in March 1978, which was a cover of "It Only Hurts for a Little While." It became Smith's second number hit on the Billboard country chart later that year. The third and final single issued from the LP was Smith's cover of Kitty Kallen's "Little Things Mean a Lot" (issued in August 1978). The song reached number three on the same chart. In addition, two singles reached the top ten of the RPM country singles chart in Canada. "It Only Hurts for a Little While" reached the top spot of the chart.

Track listing

Vinyl and cassette versions

Personnel
All credits are adapted from the original liner notes of Don't Break the Heart That Loves You.

Musical personnel

 Tommy Allsup – musician
 Kenneth Buttrey – musician
 Jimmy Capps – musician
 Jerry Carrigan – musician
 Curly Chalker – musician
 Tommy Cogbill – musician
 Pete Drake – musician
 Ray Edenton – musician
 Buddy Emmons – musician
 Steve Gibson – musician
 Kenny Malone – musician
 Grady Martin – musician
 Charlie McCoy – musician
 Farrell Morris – musician
 Billy Puett – musician

 Hargus "Pig" Robbins – musician
 Billy Sanford – musician
 Margo Smith – lead vocals
 Henry Strzelecki – musician
 Pete Wade – musician
 Bobby Wood – musician

Technical personnel
 Lou Bradley – engineer
 Sound Seventy – backing vocals
 Ed Thrasher – photography
 Bergen White – string arrangement
 Norro Wilson – producer

Charts

Release history

References

1978 albums
Albums produced by Norro Wilson
Margo Smith albums
Warner Records albums